Ocymyrmex is an African genus of ants in the subfamily Myrmicinae, also commonly known as hotrod ants.

Distribution and habitat
Species are thermophilic (thrives at relatively high temperatures) and live in dry savanna to extreme desert conditions in parts of the Afrotropics. They seem to be restricted to Southern and Eastern Africa, with no species occurring in West and Central Africa, or the sub-Saharan Sahelian Zone. Their nests are located deep in the ground, usually in sandy soil, with colonies consisting of 200 to 1000 individuals. Adapted to arid climates, they move remarkably fast during the day. They feed mainly on corpses of heat-stricken animals, living termites and seeds.

Species

Ocymyrmex afradu Bolton & Marsh, 1989
Ocymyrmex alacer Bolton & Marsh, 1989
Ocymyrmex ankhu Bolton, 1981
Ocymyrmex barbiger Emery, 1886
Ocymyrmex cavatodorsatus Prins, 1965
Ocymyrmex celer Weber, 1943
Ocymyrmex cilliei Bolton & Marsh, 1989
Ocymyrmex cursor Bolton, 1981
Ocymyrmex dekerus Bolton & Marsh, 1989
Ocymyrmex engytachys Bolton & Marsh, 1989
Ocymyrmex flavescens Stitz, 1923
Ocymyrmex flaviventris Santschi, 1914
Ocymyrmex foreli Arnold, 1916
Ocymyrmex fortior Santschi, 1911
Ocymyrmex gariepensis Bolton & Marsh, 1989
Ocymyrmex gordoni Bolton & Marsh, 1989
Ocymyrmex hirsutus Forel, 1910
Ocymyrmex ignotus Bolton & Marsh, 1989
Ocymyrmex kahas Bolton & Marsh, 1989
Ocymyrmex laticeps Forel, 1901
Ocymyrmex micans Forel, 1910
Ocymyrmex monardi Santschi, 1930
Ocymyrmex nitidulus Emery, 1892
Ocymyrmex okys Bolton & Marsh, 1989
Ocymyrmex phraxus Bolton, 1981
Ocymyrmex picardi Forel, 1901
Ocymyrmex resekhes Bolton & Marsh, 1989
Ocymyrmex robecchii Emery, 1892
Ocymyrmex robustior Stitz, 1923
Ocymyrmex shushan Bolton, 1981
Ocymyrmex sobek Bolton, 1981
Ocymyrmex sphinx Bolton, 1981
Ocymyrmex tachys Bolton & Marsh, 1989
Ocymyrmex turneri Donisthorpe, 1931
Ocymyrmex velox Santschi, 1932
Ocymyrmex weitzeckeri Emery, 1892
Ocymyrmex zekhem Bolton, 1981

References

External links

Myrmicinae
Ant genera
Hymenoptera of Africa